John S. "Jack" Dye was a college football player and surgeon.

Vanderbilt University
He was a prominent halfback for the Vanderbilt Commodores football team of Vanderbilt University from 1895 and 1898.

1897
The team held all opponents scoreless and won its first conference title in 1897.

1898
Dye was selected All-Southern.

Surgeon
He was a successful surgeon of Chattanooga who worked at the Erlanger Hospital.

References

Vanderbilt Commodores football players
American surgeons
American football halfbacks
All-Southern college football players
19th-century players of American football